Lene Siel (born 21 August 1968) is a Danish singer. She was born in Sæby. Siel studied at both Aalborg University and Copenhagen Business School.

As a child she started to perform with her parents. Her father was Kurt Siel, a guitarist, and her mother Svanhild was a singer. She has recorded duets with among others John Denver (Perhaps love), Helmut Lotti, Roger Whittaker, David Garrett (musician) and Paul Potts.

Discography 

 Lene Siel (1991)
 Mod vinden (1993)
 Nu tændes tusind julelys (1994)
 Før mig til havet (1995)
 Mine favoritter (1996)
 I Danmark er jeg født (1998)
 Salte tårer - Søde kys (1999)
 Aftenstemning (2000)
 Som en bro over mørke vande (2002)
 Gospel (2004)
 De stille timer (2005)
 Great Moments (2007)
 Himlen i min favn (2009)
 Forelsket (2013)

References

External links 

Danish women singers
1968 births
Living people
People from Frederikshavn Municipality